The following is a timeline of the history of the city of Beaumont, Texas, USA.

19th century

 1838 – Beaumont site designated seat of Jefferson County.
 1845 – John Jay French house (residence) built.
 1872 – First Baptist Church established.
 1876 – Lumber mill in business (approximate date).
 1880 – Beaumont Enterprise newspaper begins publication.
 1881
 Beaumont Fire Company #1 organized.
 Aldermanic form of government adopted.
 1889 – Beaumont Journal newspaper begins publication.
 1890 – Population: 3,296.
 1892 – Rice mill in business.
 1900 – Population: 9,427.

20th century

 1901
 January 10: Oil discovered at Spindletop.
 Texas Fuel Company (later Texaco) in business.
 Synagogue built.
 1903
 Chamber of Commerce founded.
 YMCA built.
 1907 – Beaumont Fair (later South Texas State Fair) begins.
 1910 – Population: 20,640.
 1913 – Port Arthur-Beaumont Interurban Railway begins operating.
 1916 – River channel dug.
 1917 – National Association for the Advancement of Colored People branch organized.
 1918 – Rio Theatre in business.
 1919 – "City-manager and commission form of government" adopted.
 1920 – Population: 40,422.
 1923 – Tyrrell Public Library founded.
 1924 – KFDM radio begins broadcasting.
 1925
 November: More oil discovered at Spindletop.
 Gulf States Utilities Company in business.
 1927
 "30-foot ship canal" dug.
 Jefferson Theatre in business.
 1930
 "32-foot channel" dug for ships.
 Beaumont Little Theater built.
 Population: 57,732.
 1932 – Jefferson County Courthouse built.
 1936 – Beauxart Gardens housing for urban poor created near Beaumont (approximate date).
 1943 – June: Beaumont race riot of 1943.
 1943–1944 – Beaumont served as a stand-in for Paris, France for Royal Air Force airmen cadets flying on frequent training missions from their base in Terrell, Texas.
 1950 – Population: 94,014.
 1955 – KFDM-TV (television) begins broadcasting.
 1961 – KBMT-TV (television) begins broadcasting.
 1966 – Roman Catholic Diocese of Beaumont established.
 1967 – Beaumont Heritage Society formed.
 1983 – McFaddin–Ward House museum established.
 1987 – Texas Energy Museum established.
 1991 – Southeast Texas Food Bank established.
 1998 – City website online (approximate date).

21st century

 2007 – Becky Ames becomes mayor.
 2010 – Population: city 118,296; megaregion 19,728,244.
 2013 – Randy Weber becomes U.S. representative for Texas's 14th congressional district.

See also
 Beaumont history
 List of mayors of Beaumont, Texas
 National Register of Historic Places listings in Jefferson County, Texas
 Timelines of other cities in the Southeast Texas area of Texas: Austin,  Houston, Pasadena

References

Bibliography

 
 
  circa 1926? 
 
  
 
 Paul E. Isaac. "Municipal Reform in Beaumont, Texas, 1902–1909." Southwestern Historical Quarterly 78, 1975

External links

 
 
 
 Items related to Beaumont, Texas, various dates (via Digital Public Library of America)

Beaumont